Telecinco Cinema, S.A.U. is the film production division of Mediaset España. It produces both feature films and television films.

History
Telecinco Cinema is a subsidiary film company of Mediaset España. Formerly known as Estudios Picasso, the subsidiary adopted its current brand identity (Telecinco Cinema) in 2007.

While the company continues in the middle of postproduction of The Impossible, the new film by director J. A. Bayona starring Naomi Watts and Ewan McGregor; they are also working on Tadeo Jones, a 3D animation film directed by Enrique Gato.

Some other pictures produced or co-produced by Telecinco Cinema include Amigos... a comedy by Borja Manso and Marcos Cabotá, Verbo, and Dark Impulse, No Rest for the Wicked, ranked fifth among Spanish box office in 2011 and won five Goya Awards including Best Picture, Best Director and Best Original Screenplay.

Telecinco Cinema has undertaken some of Spain's biggest international hits, including Guillermo del Toro's Pan's Labyrinth (US$83 million gross at the international box office); and J. A. Bayona's The Orphanage (US$78 million) and The Impossible (US$198 million). It also produced or co-produced films such as Steven Soderbergh's Che, which won the Best Actor Award for Benicio del Toro at Cannes 2008; or the latest Agora (Alejandro Amenábar) and Cell 211 (Daniel Monzón), the highest-grossing titles of the 2009 Spanish box office, who won together fifteen Goya Awards.

Telecinco Cinema produces all genres, as shown by their filmography, with titles like Álex de la Iglesia's The Oxford Murders, Alatriste by Agustín Díaz Yanes, Brad Anderson's Transsiberian or the first Spanish spoof film Spanish Movie.

The studio has also undertaken film remakes such as Perfect Strangers (2017), I Can Quit Whenever I Want (2019), If I Were Rich (2019) and Undercover Wedding Crashers (2021).

Films

References

Bibliography 
 

 
Film production companies of Spain
Castilian cinema
Companies based in the Community of Madrid
Mass media companies established in 1996
Spanish companies established in 1996
Mediaset España Comunicación
Spanish film studios